1987 is a 2014 autobiographic movie of the director Ricardo Trogi starring Jean-Carl Boucher as Ricardo Trogi and Sandrine Bisson as Claudette Trogi. It is the sequel to the movie 1981, which came out in 2009. The movie puts emphasis on Trogi's teen years, when he was experiencing family problems and discovering his sexual identity. It also demonstrates the life of second-generation migrants.

A third film in the series, 1991, was released in 2018.

Plot
In 1987, 17-year-old Ricardo (Jean-Carl Boucher) is facing the usual teenage problems, such as having a crush on a classmate named Sarah, despite already having a girlfriend named Marie-Josée, and having a car. With his three friends, he spends time going to parties and getting drunk. When they fail to enter a bar after graduation, Ricardo then decides to open a bar for underaged teens.

On his first night of work, when he was supposed to have sex with Marie-Josée and lose his virginity, Ricardo breaks a BMW, putting the damage and repairs on the restaurant's budget, and is immediately fired; an argument with his father causes the latter to start making wine illegally. One night, Ricardo and his friends find an expensive radio in a car and they steal it to gain money and they become thieves. After being able to enter the bar, Ricardo gets unwillingly closer to Sarah.

On his prom day, Ricardo learns that Marie-Josée had an affair with a man in the bar Ricardo always tries to go and they break up; he also learns his project of bar got made in a near region and one of his friends has been admitted to the NHL. To get revenge on Marie-Josée, Ricardo has a date with Sarah and goes awry when Sarah announces her homosexuality and Ricardo finds Dallaire, one of his friends, with Marie-Josée. Trying to talk to Marie-Josée, Ricardo gets drunk on his father's wine and is arrested by the police after the officer finds the stolen radios and Ricardo tries to flee. Thinking Dallaire tricked Ricardo for having a date with Marie-Josée, Ricardo blames Dallaire for the stolen radios.

The next morning, an argument occurs with his parents over Ricardo's activities and his father's illegal business. The argument is interrupted when Ricardo's sister announces Marie-Josée has called. Ricardo then takes a bike and cycles three hours to Trois-Rivières,  to and have sex with Marie-Josée.

It is later revealed that the relationship has ended after 3 years and Ricardo never saw Dallaire again.

Cast

Soundtrack 
 "Cum On Feel the Noize" - Performed by Quiet Riot

 "Ce soir l'amour est dans tes yeux" - Performed by Martine St-Clair 
 "Forever Young" - Performed by Alphaville 
 "Lavender" - Performed by Marillion 
 "Space Age Love Song" - Performed by A Flock of Seagulls
 "It's Like That" - Performed by Run-D.M.C. 
 "It's a sin" - Performed by Pet Shop Boys 
 "Everytime I See Your Picture" - Performed by Luba 
 "I canto degli Italiani" - Written by Groffredo Mameli & Michele Novaro
 "The Ride of the Valkyries" - Performed by Wiener Philharmoniker

Reception 
The film was met with positive reviews from local Montreal journals.

Release 
The film was released in theaters in the summer of 2014 and released on DVD, Blu-ray, and limited edition VHS in December 2014.

References

External links
 
 1987 at Library and Archives Canada

2014 films
Films directed by Ricardo Trogi
2010s French-language films
Canadian coming-of-age comedy-drama films
Films set in 1987
Films set in Quebec City
Works about Italian-Canadian culture
2010s coming-of-age comedy-drama films
2014 comedy films
2014 drama films
French-language Canadian films
2010s Canadian films